James Robert Cooter (born July 3, 1984) is an American football coach who is the offensive coordinator of the Indianapolis Colts of the National Football League (NFL). He previously served as the offensive coordinator for the Detroit Lions from 2015 until 2018, and also worked as running backs coach for the New York Jets. He played college football for the University of Tennessee, and started out coaching for his alma mater before becoming an NFL coach.

Early life and education
Jim Bob Cooter attended Lincoln County High School in Fayetteville, Tennessee, and the University of Tennessee, where he was a backup quarterback for the Tennessee Volunteers football team. He appeared in three games for the Volunteers, and was named to the Academic All-Southeastern Conference team.

Coaching career

Early career
Cooter served as a graduate assistant for Tennessee in 2007 and 2008. He was then hired as an offensive assistant by the Indianapolis Colts, working for them from 2009 through 2011. Cooter served as the offensive quality control coach for the Kansas City Chiefs in 2012 and then joined the Denver Broncos as an offensive assistant in 2013 with the support of Peyton Manning.

Detroit Lions
The Lions hired Cooter as their quarterbacks coach in 2014. After the season, they denied a request of the Chicago Bears, who wanted to interview him for their offensive coordinator position.

The Lions promoted Cooter to offensive coordinator during the 2015 season, after former offensive coordinator Joe Lombardi was fired midseason. He remained  the offensive coordinator for the Lions until January 1, 2019, when it was announced that the Lions would not be renewing his contract.

New York Jets
On February 8, 2019, the New York Jets hired Cooter as the running backs coach under new head coach Adam Gase.

Jacksonville Jaguars
On February 17, 2022, Cooter was hired by the Jacksonville Jaguars as their passing game coordinator under head coach Doug Pederson.

Indianapolis Colts
On February 20, 2023, Cooter was hired as an offensive coordinator by the Indianapolis Colts.

Personal life
Cooter is from Fayetteville. He was arrested for driving under the influence in June 2006, and was suspended from the Volunteers as a result. In 2009, he was charged with aggravated burglary after climbing into a window and getting into a woman's bed. The charges were later dropped.

References

External links
Indianapolis Colts profile
University of Tennessee profile

Living people
1984 births
American football quarterbacks
Denver Broncos coaches
Detroit Lions coaches
Indianapolis Colts coaches
Jacksonville Jaguars coaches
Kansas City Chiefs coaches
National Football League offensive coordinators
People from Lincoln County, Tennessee
Tennessee Volunteers football players